Noriyoshi (written: 宣福, 典良, 規勝 or のりよし in hiragana) is a masculine Japanese given name. Notable people with the name include:

 (born 1963), Japanese video game designer and producer
 (born 1969), Japanese baseball player
 (born 1992), Japanese footballer
 (born 1966), Japanese photographer

Japanese masculine given names